Deberah Kula  is a former Democratic member of the Pennsylvania House of Representatives for the 52nd legislative district. She was elected in 2006.

Prior to her legislative career, Kula served as Magisterial District Judge in North Union Township, Pennsylvania. She also served as Court Administrator for the Fayette County Court of Common Pleas.

References

External links
Pennsylvania House of Representatives - Deberah Kula  
Pennsylvania House Democratic Caucus - Deberah Kula  
Deberah Kula, 52nd District campaign 

Living people
Members of the Pennsylvania House of Representatives
Women state legislators in Pennsylvania
21st-century American politicians
21st-century American women politicians
Year of birth missing (living people)